Dorudzan (also Romanized as Dorūdzan and Drūdzan) also previously known as Chirkisabad, in reference to its Circassian inhabitants, is a village in Dorudzan Rural District, Dorudzan District, Marvdasht County, Fars Province, Iran. At the 2006 census, its population was 1,617, in 393 families.

References 

Populated places in Marvdasht County